Niclas Järund (born 14 January 1962) is a former Swedish and Norwegian (after 1988) curler and curling coach.

Teams

Record as a coach of national teams

References

External links
 
 
 Video: 

Living people
1962 births
Swedish male curlers
Norwegian male curlers
European curling champions
Norwegian curling coaches
Swedish emigrants to Norway